The Irish surname Cullinane, Ó Cuilleanáin or Ó Cuilleannáin may refer to:

Surname:
The name seems to be related to Cullen. While Cullen is encountered primarily in Dublin and southeast Ireland, Cullinan/Cullinane used almost exclusively in western Ireland on a north–south-Axis from County Galway to County Cork.

Notable persons of the name are:
 Seán Ó Cuilleanáin (John Cullinane), Irish scribe and translator, fl. 1837–1845
 Charlie Cullinane (born 1945), Irish Sportsman
 Seán Cullinane (Séán Ó Cuilleannáin) (born 1969), Irish sportsman
 Majella Cullinane, New Zealand writer and poet
 The four nationalist Cullinane sisters of Newtown Kilmacthomas, County Waterford: eldest sister Mary (later Power), Katie (Kent), Hannah Imelda (Power) and Bridget Cullinane, active in the period after 1916.
 David Cullinane (born 4 July 1974), Sinn Féin TD in Waterford
 John Cullinan, Nationalist MP for Tipperary elected in 1900, remained in Westminster until 1918.
 John Cullinane, founder of Cullinet, an early software company.
 Sir Frederick Fitzjames Cullinan (born County Clare, 1845–1913), Principal Clerk of the Chief Secretary's Office, Dublin Castle

Fictional people include:
 Dr. John Cullinane, archeologist and significant character in The Source by James Michener, 1965
 Karl Cullinane, main character in the Guardians of the Flame series by Joel Rosenberg

References 

Surnames of Irish origin